Wister is a neighborhood in Northwest Philadelphia, Pennsylvania, United States.  It is bounded by Chelten Avenue to the north, Germantown Avenue to the west, Belfield Avenue to the east, and Wister Street to the south.
Wister is a section within Germantown.
The Clarkson-Watson House, Fisher's Lane, Grumblethorpe, Grumblethorpe Tenant House, and Ivy Lodge are listed on the National Register of Historic Places.

References

 
Neighborhoods in Philadelphia